Palmiet River is a river located in the Western Cape province of South Africa. The Palmiet River is a typical Western Cape river, experiencing winter rainfall and it is important for the Western Cape Water Supply System. It has a small catchment area of 500 km2, flows through the expanse of the Elgin Valley, and reaches the ocean through an estuary.

This river has five irrigation and hydro-power dams along its length, and provides water for agricultural and industrial uses, as well as to the city of Cape Town. It is unclear why there has been an apparent increase in flow over the last 30 years.

This river is named after the plant known as Palmiet (Prionium serratum) and should not be confused with the Palmiet River near Durban, or the Palmiet River which is a tributary of the Keurbooms River.

Dams in this River
Arieskraal Dam
Eikenhof Dam
Kogelberg Dam
Rockview Dam
Transpalmiet Dam

See also
 Elgin, Western Cape
 Breede Water Management Area
 List of drainage basins of South Africa
 List of rivers of South Africa
Palmiet Pumped Storage Scheme

References

External links

Walk the Palmiet River Trail (Kleinmond)
‘Kleinmond. Palmiet river’ 

Rivers of the Western Cape
Elgin, Western Cape